Upper Nile is a state in South Sudan. The White Nile flowes through the state, giving it its name. The state also shares a similar name with the region of Greater Upper Nile, of which it was part along with the states of Unity and Jonglei. Malakal was the capital of the state. The town of Kodok, the location of the Fashoda Incident that ended the "Scramble for Africa", was located in the state. Upper Nile seceded from Sudan as part of the Republic of South Sudan on 9 July 2011.

In October 2015, the states of South Sudan were reorganized into 28 states by President Salva Kiir. This was reversed as the result of a peace agreement signed on 22 February 2020.

Counties 
Upper Nile is subdivided into 13 counties:
 Baliet County
 Fashoda County
 Longechuk County
 Maban County
 Malakal County
 Manyo County
 Maiwut County
 Melut County
 Nasir County
 Panyikang County
 Renk County
 Ulang County
 Akoka County

Newspapers and television 

Most Upper Nile State citizens have limited access to news and other media information. In cities like Malakal, only a few officials could read weekly newspaper bulletins.  The only TV station for the people of Upper Nile State is South Sudan Television. Although the Station works for only few hours, it is widely popular in the state capital. Some foreign TV stations are also broadcast in the area using portable satellite dishes.

See also 

2007 Sudan floods

References 

 
States of South Sudan
Greater Upper Nile